Mark Llandro "Dong" Latorre Mendoza (born August 29, 1973) is a Filipino politician. He is the Presidential Adviser on Legislative Affairs and head of the Presidential Legislative Liaison Office, a member of the cabinet of Philippine President Bongbong Marcos. He last served as the Secretary General of the House of Representatives of the Philippines under the speakership of Marinduque Lone District Rep. Lord Allan Velasco. Mendoza is a member of the Nationalist People's Coalition, of which he serves as its secretary-general to date. He also served as a Member of the House of Representatives representing the 4th District of Batangas from 2007 to 2016. He also unsuccessfully ran for governor of Batangas in 2016 and for a comeback to the Congress as representative of the same district in 2019. He is the son of Leandro Mendoza, the former Department of Transportation and Communications Secretary and former head of the Philippine National Police.

References

External links
 

People from Batangas
1973 births
Living people
Nationalist People's Coalition politicians
Members of the House of Representatives of the Philippines from Batangas
Bongbong Marcos administration cabinet members